Kole Christian Enright is a former American  Baseball Third Baseman. He was drafted in the 3rd round of the 2016 Major League Baseball season draft,

Amateur career
Enright hit.417 and had 18 extra-base hits (13 doubles, one triple, and four home runs), 21 RBIs, and 34 runs scored for the West Orange High School as a senior during the spring High School Season of 2016, helping the team to its first-ever participation in the Florida High School Athletic Association Final Four.

Professional career
Enright was drafted in the 3rd round of the 2016 Major League Baseball draft by the Texas Rangers.

Enright signed for a bonus of $675,000, $72,000 above the slotted value as the No. 99 overall pick in the third round.

After batting .313 in the Arizona Rookie League he scored 17 RBI through just 42 games.

In 2019, he made a comeback with the Hickory Crawdads, a Low-A affiliate of the Texas Rangers.

Despite not being named to the Rangers' 60-man summer camp roster, which was announced in June 2020, Enright remained on the team's payroll following a productive season with the Class A Hickory Crawdads previous summer.

Enright finished the latter half of the 2021 season with the Beloit Snappers.

References

External links

MiLB Stats

Living people
Baseball players from Florida
Major League Baseball third basemen
Texas Rangers players
Arizona League Rangers players
Arizona Complex League Rangers players
Hickory Crawdads players
1998 births